"Insieme: 1992" ("Together: 1992") was the winning song of the Eurovision Song Contest 1990, in Zagreb, Yugoslavia, performed in Italian by Toto Cutugno for , the country's second victory in the contest.

Eurovision
Cutugno sang about bringing the disparate nations of Europe together. The "1992" of the title refers to the year in which the European Union was scheduled to begin operation, thus bringing the hope of the lyric to fruition.

The song was performed nineteenth on the night, following 's Edin-Ådahl with "Som en vind" and preceding 's Simone with "Keine Mauern mehr". At the close of voting, it had received 149 points, placing 1st in a field of 22.

Track listings
CD single
 "Insieme: 1992" – 4:00
 "Insieme: 1992" (instrumental) – 4:00

7" single
 "Insieme: 1992" – 4:00
 "Insieme: 1992" (instrumental) – 4:00

Charts

Weekly charts

Year-end charts

Certifications

References

1990 singles
Eurovision songs of Italy
Eurovision songs of 1990
Toto Cutugno songs
Songs written by Toto Cutugno
Eurovision Song Contest winning songs
Italian-language songs
1990 songs
EMI Records singles
Songs about Europe